The Italian general election of 1992 took place on 5–6 March 1992.

The election was a realigning one in Italy, due to the rise of Lega Nord, a federation of northern regionalist parties of which LV was a founding member. The realignment was especially visible in Veneto, where DC, though still being the largest party, lost almost a third of its voters between 1987 and 1992, stopping at 31.5%. LV gained ground in the Pedemontana, that is to say the provinces at the feet of the mountains, most of which had long been Christian Democratic heartlands: 21.5% in the province of Treviso, 20.6% in Verona and 19.5% in Vicenza. In Belluno LV became the largest party with 27.8%, by reducing the vote of DC and halving that of the PSI. The total score of Venetist parties was 31.8% in Vicenza, 29.3% in Treviso, 27.2% in Verona and 22.9% in Padua. The PDS got just 9.9% regionally, fairly less than the PCI in 1990.

Results

Chamber of Deputies
* = Including Liga Veneta.Source: Regional Council of Veneto

Provincial breakdown
Ven. = Other Venetists, including LAV, UPV and MVRA.Source: Regional Council of Veneto

Senate
* = Including Liga Veneta.Source: Regional Council of Veneto

Elections in Veneto
General, Veneto